JibJab is an American digital entertainment studio based in Los Angeles, California. Founded in 1999 by brothers Evan and Gregg Spiridellis, it first achieved widespread attention during the 2004 US presidential election when their video of George W. Bush and John Kerry singing This Land Is Your Land became a viral hit. Initially known for political and social satire, JibJab produced commercials and shorts for clients such as Sony, Noggin, Cartoon Network, Nickelodeon, PBS Kids, Sprout, NBC, Qubo, and Disney before focusing on its now-flagship personalized eCard and messaging services. In 2016, its animated sticker-making program – which has been available since 2004 – became the top App Store app by download growth.

In 2012, JibJab also expanded into the children's educational market with its multi-platform learning program, StoryBots, which has since spawned two Netflix TV series, Ask the StoryBots and StoryBots Super Songs.

In 2019, JibJab was acquired by the private equity firm Catapult Capital.

Political satire

"Capitol Ill"
For the 2000 Presidential Election' JibJab released a Flash movie entitled "Capitol Ill" in July 2000, which featured an animated rap battle between George W. Bush and Al Gore. Bill Clinton and George H. W. Bush also make appearances.

"Ahnuld for Governor"
In 2003, JibJab produced a Flash movie poking fun at Arnold Schwarzenegger's campaign for Governor of California. It depicts Schwarzenegger giving a campaign speech.

"This Land"
For the 2004 United States presidential election, JibJab created a Flash movie entitled "This Land," released on July 9, 2004, which featured animated versions of George W. Bush and John Kerry - voiced by comedian Jim Meskimen - singing a parody of Woody Guthrie's song This Land Is Your Land.

The video was considered an instant success, eventually being viewed on every continent (including Antarctica) as well as the International Space Station. The traffic surge forced JibJab's server to be shut down after one day, and the clip was placed on AtomFilms, where it got more than 1 million hits in 24 hours.

After being linked to on thousands of websites, the video was featured several times in the printed media and on television, including NBC Nightly News, Fox News and ABC World News Tonight. On July 26, 2004, the creators appeared on The Tonight Show with Jay Leno. In December 2004, the Spiridellis brothers were named People of the Year by Peter Jennings.

The Richmond Organization, a music publisher that owns the copyright to Guthrie's tune through its Ludlow Music Unit, threatened legal action. JibJab responded with a lawsuit in a California federal court, claiming the song was protected under a fair use exemption for parodies. JibJab and Ludlow Music reached a settlement after JibJab's attorneys unearthed evidence that the song had passed into the public domain in 1973. The terms of the settlement allowed for the continued distribution of This Land.

"Good to Be in DC"
In October 2004, JibJab followed up with another original animation, "Good to Be in DC," set to the tune of Dan Emmett's "Dixie". In this video, animated versions of George W. Bush, Dick Cheney, John Kerry, and John Edwards sing about their hopes for the upcoming election.

"Second Term"
Immediately after George W. Bush's election victory, JibJab released a third video, "Second Term." Set to the tune of "She'll Be Coming 'Round the Mountain", an animated Bush gloats over his successful bid for a second term as president, and his plans for it, based on his campaign promises.

"Time for Some Campaignin'"
For the 2008 Presidential Election, JibJab released another election-themed animation, "Time for Some Campaignin'" in July of that year. Set to the tune of Bob Dylan's "The Times They Are a-Changin", animated versions of Bill and Hillary Clinton, John McCain, Barack Obama, George W. Bush, and Dick Cheney sing of their presidential hopes. This video was the first instance where viewers had the option of using Jibjab's e-card website to insert their own face as that of a harassed voter.

"He's Barack Obama"
Upon Barack Obama becoming president, JibJab released "He's Barack Obama", where they portrayed Obama as a superhero. The music becomes a heavy metal interpretation of "When Johnny Comes Marching Home", as Obama promises he will fix the Middle East, defeat the Taliban, fix the schools, fight a giant space robot, wrestle a bear, fix the deficit and more.

2012 Election
For the 2012 Presidential Election, JibJab did not make an election video and instead began to focus their efforts on their e-card business. However, an election web app was released in late October of that year.

Year in Review
Starting in 2005, and for the next nine consecutive years until 2014, JibJab annually released "Year in Review" videos, usually late in December between Christmas and New Year's Day, sung to all various classical melodies. The videos were originally uploaded on YouTube and their website. but on December 11, 2015, JibJab made a Facebook announcement that they would not be releasing anymore "Year in Review" videos as the brothers had begun finding them creatively unfulfilling. By then, ten "Year in Review" videos had been made; by the winter of 2016, JibJab removed all "Year in Review" videos from their website (although they would remain on their YouTube channel) and started to focus on their eCard videos instead. However, on November 24, 2020, in response to popular demand, JibJab revived the "Year In Review" series with a video about the past year, the first to use a non-classical tune, instead being custom-written.

Others

Big Box Mart
In 2005, JibJab released the video "Big Box Mart". Sung to the tune of "Oh, Susannah", it tells the story of a 53-year-old frequent patron of the titular big-box store, who is enthralled by the store's discounts and offers, but soon loses his job as a factory worker, which is outsourced to Beijing, China as a result of the company now selling cheap products to Big Box Mart stores. The man is left no choice but to be employed at his local Big Box Mart for the rest of his life.

What We Call the News
Sung to the tune of "Battle Hymn of the Republic", "What We Call the News" laments the decline of journalism in the cable TV era, particularly sensationalistic stories.

Founding Fathers Rap
George Washington, Benjamin Franklin, and Thomas Jefferson rap about their accomplishments and end their verse with "We Declare Our independence". They are accompanied by John Adams and James Madison. Adams is the DJ, and Madison says "Oh Yeah" after every verse.

Shawshank in a Minute
This sketch was part (and winner) of a 2006 online competition, The Great Sketch Experiment, held by JibJab and their first live action production. Participants included the comedy duo Famous Last Nerds (Jordan Allen-Dutton and Erik Weiner) and John Landis as director. It both summarizes and parodies The Shawshank Redemption, condensing the plot to a length of nearly three minutes and underlining it with rap music.

Music videos
JibJab produced a music video for the 2006 song "Do I Creep You Out?" by Weird Al Yankovic, a parody of Taylor Hicks' "Do I Make You Proud?". The video depicts the main character stalking a barista in increasingly disturbing ways, ending with his being arrested and jailed as he publicly professes his emotions in a song. In 2009 JibJab produced another music video for Yankovic for the song "CNR", which is a style parody of The White Stripes. The video and song portrays Charles Nelson Reilly as a superhuman doing seemingly impossible or improbable things. It also features Yankovic and Jon "Bermuda" Schwartz as Jack White and Meg White respectively.

E-cards and messaging
Starting in October 2007, JibJab began its focus on personalized eCards and videos, letting users insert photographs of their faces into humorous birthday cards, holiday greetings and congratulatory notes and send them to other people as e-cards or "sendables". Initially, this included branded personalized videos, including working with OfficeMax on the video site Elf Yourself, where an uploaded photo is put onto a singing and dancing elf, as well as partnerships with Star Wars (for the 30th anniversary of The Empire Strikes Back) and Mad Men. A series of eCards were created by Internet personality Dane Boedigheimer (best known for later creating The Annoying Orange) known as "From the Fridge", featuring anthropomorphized foods such as eggs, chocolates, avocados, pumpkins, cranberries, and cookies suffering a horrifying torture or death in accordance with their use or consumption for events and holidays such as birthdays, anniversaries, congratulation, Valentine's Day, the Super Bowl, Easter, Halloween, Thanksgiving, and Christmas.

Since then, in addition to greeting eCards, JibJab has also extended its personalization technology to popular music videos, including:
 ...Baby One More Time (Britney Spears)
 Friday (Rebecca Black)
 Gangnam Style (Psy)
 Sexy and I Know It (LMFAO)
 Shut Up and Dance (Walk the Moon)
 Addicted to Love (Robert Palmer)
 Roar (Katy Perry)
 Take On Me (A-ha)
 All About That Bass (Meghan Trainor)
 Cake by the Ocean (DNCE)
 Happy (Pharrell Williams)
 Sorry (Justin Bieber)
 Cheap Thrills (Sia)
Since launching its eCard service, more than 100 million people have visited JibJab's website annually. In 2014, the company launched a messaging app for personalized animated GIFs, available on both IOS and Android platforms. In 2016, the JibJab app was one of the first mobile apps to be enable for IMessage and was ranked first among them in download growth. The JibJab app was also featured prominently in Apple's annual WWDC product presentation.

StoryBots

In 2012, JibJab expanded into the children's educational market with its multi-platform learning program, StoryBots. The brand currently includes web-based educational content, as well as two Netflix television series, Ask the StoryBots and StoryBots Super Songs.

See also
 List of most popular websites
 Vyond
 Elf Yourself
 Meme
 YouTube
StoryBots

References

External links
JibJab.com
JibJab.com on Facebook
JibJab.com on Twitter
JibJab on YouTube

1999 establishments in California
Adult animation
American comedy websites
Companies based in Los Angeles
Ebooks
Internet memes
Internet memes introduced in 2004
Internet properties established in 1999
2019 mergers and acquisitions